Roberto Vágner Chinoca (born 2 May 1950), known as just Vágner, is a Brazilian footballer. He competed in the men's tournament at the 1972 Summer Olympics.

References

External links
 

1950 births
Living people
Brazilian footballers
Brazil international footballers
Olympic footballers of Brazil
Footballers at the 1972 Summer Olympics
Footballers from São Paulo
Association footballers not categorized by position